Antaeotricha ostodes is a moth in the family Depressariidae. It was described by Lord Walsingham in 1913. It is found in Guatemala.

The wingspan is 19–20 mm. The forewings are bone-white with a very faint suffusion of bone-grey on the dorsal half and in a semicircular shade arising from the tornus. A greyish fuscous spot, at the extreme base of the costa, is followed by another costal spot at one-fifth, and before the apex are two faint, elongate, greyish fuscous costal shades. A small very faint reduplicated spot, on the disc at one-fourth, is followed by a similar double dot at the end of the cell, beneath which is a small inwardly oblique greyish fuscous dorsal streak. The hindwings are pale bone-grey, the costa much elevated at the base, with a broad fringe of spatulate scales, greyish fuscous on their underside, also a long pencil of pale bone-ochreous hair-scales from near the base of the costa on the upperside.

References

Moths described in 1913
ostodes
Moths of Central America